Vincent Raditya (born 7 November 1984) is an Indonesian pilot and YouTuber from Jakarta, Indonesia. He is one of the first aviator YouTube vlogger from Indonesia and is mostly known for his YouTube channel Captain Vincent Raditya. Raditya is known for producing avation and automotive related videos on YouTube.

Early life and education
Vincent Raditya was born in Jakarta, the capital and of Indonesia. In 2009, he began his first flight training course at Epic Aviation, in the United States.

Career
Vincent Raditya has been a pilot since 2010 and started vlogging on YouTube.

The Indonesian Air Force Information Service (AU) has collaborate with Captain Vincent, to promote awareness of aerospace.

In 2017, he and his colleague Nikko Agustino were build a Simulator Repair Based Cessna 172 G1000 aircraft using a used aircraft frame, PK-NIV, which had previously been flown by one of the Semarang accident pilots. In 2018, they were in creating a Fix Based Fix Boeing 737-800 simulator using the used airplane frame from the scrapped old Sriwijaya Air Boeing 737, PK-CJM.

In 2022, he was converted regular Civic Wonder vehicles to complete electric automobiles in his garage at home.

Controversies
In early May 2019 The Ministry of Transportation (Indonesia) revoked the special flight permit for Pilot Captain Vincent Raditya due to not adhering to regulations, such as not using the shoulder harness while a passenger sitting next to the pilot on the flying time, allowing an unauthorized person to take control of the plane and performing a zero gravity maneuver.
After being revoked for two months, he has been granted a flight license for a single-engine aircraft again.

According to the CNBC Indonesia report In April 2022, Captain Vincent Raditya was questioned by Criminal Investigation Unit at the National Police Headquarters  for 15 hours in relation to his purported involvement in an online gambling incident disguised as a trading transaction on the Binomo application.

In November 2022, the marriage of Captain Vincent Raditya and Fanny Margaretha sparked public discussion due to their having a daughter after only one week of marriage. Additionally, the couple has been met with controversy due to the 17 year age gap between them.

References

Living people
Indonesian people
1984 births